The county of Durham has returned 7 MPs to the UK Parliament since 1983. Under the Local Government Act 1972, which came into effect on 1 April 1974, the boundaries of the historic/administrative county were significantly altered with the north-east of the county, comprising more than half the electorate, being transferred to the new metropolitan county of Tyne and Wear. In addition, the borough of Hartlepool was included in the new county of Cleveland. These changes were reflected in the following redistribution of parliamentary seats which did not come into effect until the 1983 general election, resulting in a reduction in the county's representation from 16 to 7 MPs.

Number of seats 
The table below shows the number of MPs representing Durham at each major redistribution of seats affecting the county.

1Prior to 1950, seats were classified as County Divisions or Parliamentary Boroughs. Since 1950, they have been classified as County or Borough Constituencies.

2Approximate equivalent number of constituencies. Prior to the redistribution coming into effect for the 1983 general election, two constituencies were split between Durham and Tyne and Wear, one was split between Durham and Cleveland and four were wholly within the reconfigured county.

Constituencies timeline 

1Part of the North Riding of Yorkshire from 1966 to 1974 (Teesside, Stockton)

2Renamed Hartlepool in 1974

Boundary reviews

Before 1832 
As a county palatine, Durham had been unrepresented in the House of Commons until 1673, when the County of Durham and the Parliamentary Borough of Durham, both electing 2 MPs, were enfranchised by Act of Parliament.

1832 
The Great Reform Act of 1832 radically changed the representation of the House of Commons, with the County being divided into the Northern and Southern Divisions, both returning 2 MPs. In addition, Sunderland (2 MPs), Gateshead and South Shields were created as Parliamentary Boroughs.

1868 
Under the Reform Act of 1867, three additional single-member Boroughs were created, namely Darlington, The Hartlepools (Hartlepool and West Hartlepool) and Stockton-on-Tees (which also included the township of Thornaby in the North Riding of Yorkshire).

1885 
Under the Redistribution of Seats Act 1885, the two 2-member county divisions were replaced by eight single-member divisions, namely Chester-le-Street, Jarrow, Houghton-le-Spring, North-Western, Mid, South-Eastern, Bishop Auckland and Barnard Castle. The representation of the Borough of Durham was reduced to 1 MP.

1918 
Under the Representation of the People Act 1918, the number of constituencies in Durham was increased further, from 16 to 18, which resulted in significant boundary changes.

The Parliamentary Borough of Durham was abolished and was absorbed into a new County seat which also included northern areas of the abolished constituency of Mid Durham (excluding Witton Gilbert which was transferred to Chester-le-Street). The town of Hetton-le-Hole was transferred from Houghton-le-Spring.

The North Western and South Eastern Divisions were both abolished and five new county seats were established:

 Blaydon – largely created from the western part of Chester-le-Street, including Blaydon, Ryton and Whickham. Also included Tanfield, transferred from North West Durham;
 Consett – created from the bulk of North West Durham, including Annfield Plain, Benfieldside, Consett, Leadgate and Stanley;
 Seaham – created from the majority of South East Durham, including Easington and Seaham Harbour. The town of Seaham was transferred from Houghton-le-Spring;
 Sedgefield – majority, comprising Sedgefield, Billingham and rural areas surrounding the boroughs of Darlington, Stockton-on-Tees and The Hartlepools, was previously part of South East Durham. Also included small areas transferred from Mid Durham (Ferryhill) and Bishop Auckland; and
 Spennymoor – comprising Brandon and Willington from Mid Durham, Crook and Tow Law from Barnard Castle, and Spennymoor from Bishop Auckland.

Other changes included:

 parts of Jarrow transferred to South Shields and Houghton-le-Spring (Boldon);
 rural areas in the south and west of North West Durham added to Barnard Castle;
 small rural area transferred from Barnard Castle to Bishop Auckland; and
 expansion of the boundaries of the boroughs of Darlington, Stockton-on-Tees (including Thornaby-on-Tees), Sunderland and The Hartlepools to match those of the corresponding local authority boroughs.

1950 
As a result of the redistribution enacted by the Representation of the People Act 1948, Durham’s representation remained at 18 MPs.

The County Boroughs of Darlington, Gateshead, South Shields, Sunderland and West Hartlepool had all expanded since 1918 and the parliamentary boundaries were adjusted accordingly. Gateshead was split into Gateshead East and Gateshead West and the 2-member borough of Sunderland was split into Sunderland North and Sunderland South.

Three county constituencies were abolished being replaced by two new ones:

 Spennymoor – the urban district of Spennymoor was transferred to Durham, with the remainder forming the basis of the re-established constituency of North West Durham;
 Barnard Castle – northern areas (Lanchester and Weardale) added to North West Durham and southern areas (Barnard Castle and surrounding rural areas) transferred to Bishop Auckland; and
 Seaham – the urban district of Seaham was transferred to Houghton-le-Spring, with the remainder forming the new constituency of Easington.

Other changes included:

 Boldon returned to Jarrow from Houghton-le-Spring;
 Tanfield transferred from Blaydon to Consett; and
 Thornaby-on-Tees transferred from Stockton-on-Tees to the North Riding of Yorkshire constituency of Middlesbrough West.

1955 
Under the First Periodic Review of Westminster constituencies the urban district of Felling was transferred from Jarrow to Gateshead East and two Gateshead borough wards were transferred from Gateshead East to Gateshead West. Jarrow was redesignated as a borough constituency.

1974 (Feb) 
The Second Periodic Review, which came into effect for the February 1974 election, resulted in the number of MPs representing Durham falling from 18 to 16.

The borough of Stockton-on-Tees had been absorbed into the County Borough of Teesside in 1966 and was now part of the North Riding of Yorkshire.

The constituency of Sedgefield was abolished and its contents distributed as follows:

 Billingham was also absorbed into the County Borough of Teesside and it was added to Stockton-on-Tees to form the North Riding of Yorkshire constituency of Teesside, Stockton;
 rural areas to the west of Stockton and Hartlepool added to Easington;
 rural areas around Darlington added to Bishop Auckland; and
 Sedgefield and surrounding areas added to Durham.

Other changes included:

 Spennymoor transferred from Durham to North West Durham;
 Hetton-le-Hole transferred back from Durham to Houghton-le-Spring;
 Murton transferred from Easington to Houghton-le-Spring;
 Following the expansion of the County Borough of Sunderland, Sunderland South gained parts of Houghton-le-Spring and the boundary between Sunderland North and Sunderland South was realigned;
 Blaydon was redesignated as a borough constituency; and
 The Hartlepools was renamed Hartlepool following the amalgamation of the boroughs of Hartlepool and West Hartlepool.

1974 (Apr) 
Shortly after the Second Periodic Review came into effect, the county was subject to a major reconfiguration under the terms of the Local Government Act 1972. As a result, with effect from 1 April 1974, the constituencies of Blaydon, Gateshead West, Gateshead East, Jarrow, South Shields, Sunderland North, Sunderland South, most of Houghton-le-Spring and part of Chester-le-Street were now included in the new metropolitan county of Tyne and Wear. In addition, Hartlepool and part of Easington were now included in the new non-metropolitan county of Cleveland.

1983 
The next change to parliamentary constituency boundaries, following the recommendations of the Third Periodic Review, reflected the change in county boundaries and reorganisation of local government authorities in 1974. This review did not come into effect for a further nine years, at the 1983 general election, and resulted in the following changes:
 Chester-le-Street was abolished. The new town of Washington (now part of the borough of Sunderland) was included in the new Tyne and Wear constituency of Houghton and Washington and the parishes of Birtley and Lamesley (now part of the borough of Gateshead) was added to Blaydon. Remaining areas, including the town of Chester-le-Street were included in the new constituency of North Durham;
 Consett was abolished. Eastern areas (former urban district of Stanley) were added to North Durham. Western areas (former urban district of Consett) were transferred to North West Durham;
 areas of the abolished constituency of Houghton-le-Spring which were retained within Durham (Seaham and Murton) were transferred back to Easington;
 southern parts of Easington (former rural district of Stockton) were now part of Cleveland and split between Hartlepool and the new constituencies of Stockton North and Stockton South;
 Sedgefield was re-established with similar boundaries to the pre-1974 constituencies, but now included Spennymoor, transferred from North West Durham, but excluding the new town of Newton Aycliffe, which was retained in Bishop Auckland;
 Brandon was transferred from North West Durham to Durham (now officially designated as the City of Durham): and
 The sparsely populated area comprising the former Rural District of Startforth, which had been transferred from the North Riding of Yorkshire to Durham, added to Bishop Auckland.

1997 
There were a limited number of changes under the Fourth Review:
 Two District of Derwentside wards were transferred from North Durham to North West Durham; and
 Spennymoor was transferred from Sedgefield to Bishop Auckland in exchange for Newton Aycliffe.

2010 
At the Fifth Review there were only minor changes due to the revision of local authority ward boundaries.

Maps

Communities timeline 
The table below shows which constituencies represented major communities within the current county (including Darlington) from 1885 onwards.

See also 

 List of parliamentary constituencies in County Durham
 History of parliamentary constituencies and boundaries in Tyne and Wear

References 

Parliamentary constituencies in County Durham (historic)